Soufiane Bidaoui (born 20 April 1990) is a Moroccan professional footballer who plays as a midfielder for Italian  club Frosinone.

Club career
Born in Etterbeek, Belgium, Bidaoui has played club football in Belgium for Westerlo, Roeselare and Lierse. In the summer of 2013, Bidaoui signed a contract with Italian team Parma. He joined Crotone on loan for the 2013–14 season.

On 11 July 2016 Bidaoui was signed by Avellino in a 2-year contract, plus option of further season.

On 20 August 2018, he joined Serie B club Spezia.

On 14 January 2021 he signed with Ascoli.

On 31 January 2023, Bidaoui moved to Frosinone on a 1.5-year contract.

International career
Bidaoui represented Morocco at the 2012 Summer Olympics.

References

External links

1990 births
Living people
Moroccan footballers
Morocco youth international footballers
Belgian footballers
Belgian sportspeople of Moroccan descent
Lierse S.K. players
K.V.C. Westerlo players
K.S.V. Roeselare players
Parma Calcio 1913 players
F.C. Crotone players
Latina Calcio 1932 players
U.S. Avellino 1912 players
Spezia Calcio players
Ascoli Calcio 1898 F.C. players
Frosinone Calcio players
Belgian Pro League players
Serie B players
Serie A players
Belgian expatriate footballers
Belgian expatriate sportspeople in Italy
Moroccan expatriate footballers
Moroccan expatriate sportspeople in Belgium
Moroccan expatriate sportspeople in Italy
Expatriate footballers in Belgium
Expatriate footballers in Italy
Olympic footballers of Morocco
Footballers at the 2012 Summer Olympics
Association football midfielders